is a Japanese politician who currently serves as the Secretary-General of the Constitutional Democratic Party of Japan. She is a member of the House of Representatives in the Diet and represents the Niigata 1st district.

Biography 

A native of Tsubame, Niigata she attended Niigata University (as both undergraduate and graduate), a language school in Bangkok, Thailand, and University of Bristol in England. She was elected to the assembly of Niigata Prefecture for the first time in 1999 and to the Diet for the first time in 2003.

She served as a Vice Health Minister in the Noda administration and as a Parliamentary Secretary of the Foreign Minister in the Hatoyama administration.

She was appointed Secretary-General of the CDP in December 2021 following the 2021 general elections.

Her husband is former Representative Hiranao Honda from Hokkaido.

References

External links 
 Official website in Japanese

1967 births
Living people
People from Tsubame, Niigata
Alumni of the University of Bristol
Japanese expatriates in Thailand
Japanese expatriates in the United Kingdom
Female members of the House of Representatives (Japan)
Members of the House of Representatives (Japan)
Constitutional Democratic Party of Japan politicians
Democratic Party of Japan politicians
21st-century Japanese politicians
21st-century Japanese women politicians